This is a list of shopping malls in Brazil.

Ceará
 Shopping Aldeota
 Shopping Avenida
 Shopping Del Paseo
 Shopping Iguatemi Fortaleza
 Shopping RioMar
 Shopping Via Sul
 North Shopping Jóquei

Distrito Federal
 Águas Claras
 Águas Claras Shopping
 DF Plaza Shopping (under construction)
 Shopping Quê!
 Gama
 Gama Shopping
 Guará
 Casa Park
 Park Design
 Park Shopping Brasília
 Lago Norte
 Shopping Iguatemi Brasília
 Planaltina
 Planaltina Shopping (under construction)
 Brasília
 Boulevard Shopping
 Brasília Shopping
 Shopping Conjunto Nacional
 Pátio Brasil Shopping
 Shopping ID
 Venâncio Shopping (under construction)
 Santa Maria
 Santa Maria Shopping
 Sobradinho
 Sobradinho Shopping
 Sudoeste/Octogonal
 Terraço Shopping
 Taguatinga
 Alameda Shopping
 JK Shopping
 Taguatinga Shopping

Espírito Santo
 Shopping Norte-Sul
 Shopping Praia da Costa
 Shopping Vitória

Minas Gerais
 Betim Shopping
 BH Shopping
 Big Shopping
 Casa Raja Shopping
 Center Shopping Uberlândia
 Complexo Manhattan
 Diamond Mall
 GV Shopping
 Independência Shopping
 Itaú Power Shopping
 Lagoa Shopping Center
 Minas Shopping
 Minascasa
 Minassul Shopping
 Montes Claros Shopping
 P.A. Shopping
 Pampulha Mall
 Pátio Savassi
 Shopping Boulevard
 Shopping Cidade
 Shopping Del Rey
 Shopping do Vale do Aço
 Shopping Norte
 Shopping Ponteio
 Shopping Pouso Alegre
 Shopping Santa Cruz
 Shopping Uberaba
 Shopping Vilarinho
 Torre Alta Vila
 Via Shopping PL
 Viashopping

Pará
 Boulevard Shopping Belém
 Castanheira Shopping Center
 Paraíso Shopping Center
 Parque Shopping Belém
 Rio Tapajós Shopping (2013)
 Shopping Bosque Grão Pará (2013)
 Shopping Metrópole (2013)
 Shopping Modelo (2013)
 Shopping Paricá (2013)
 Shopping Pátio Belém
 Shopping Pátio Marabá (Oct. 2012)
 Tucuruí Shopping Center
 Unique Shopping Marabá (2013)
 Unique Shopping Parauapebas
 Yamada Plaza Castanhal

Paraná
 Park Shopping Barigüi - the main stores are Adidas, Tommy Hilfiger, H. Stern, Lacoste, Puma, Nike, Zara, Fnac, L'Occitane, and Calvin Klein Jeans
 Shopping Crystal - the main stores are Montblanc, H. Stern, Natan, Capoani, Gant, Lacoste, L'Occitane, and Calvin Klein Jeans
 Shopping Mueller - shopping centre localized in the centre of Curitiba; the main stores are Zara, H. Stern, Lacoste, Nike, Accessorize, and L'Occitane
Shopping Pucuru - shopping centre localized in Pucuru; the main stores are Zara, H. Stern

Pernambuco
 Paço Alfândega
 River Shopping
 Shopping Boa Viagem Outlet
 Shopping Boa Vista
 Shopping Caruaru
 Shopping Center Guararapes
 Shopping Center Recife
 Shopping Costa Dourada
 Shopping Difusora
 Shopping Norte
 Shopping Patteo Olinda
 Shopping Paulista North Way
 Shopping Plaza Casa Forte
 Shopping RioMar
 Shopping Tacaruna
 Shopping Familia Gomes da Silva
 Pedro Bó International Centre

Rio Grande do Norte
 Alamanda Mall
 Lagoa Center
 Midway Mall
 Mossoró West Shopping
 Natal Norte Shopping
 Natal Shopping
 Praia Shopping
 SeaWay Shopping
 Shopping 10
 Shopping Cidade Jardim
 Shopping Natal Sul
 Shopping Orla Sul
 Via Direta Shopping Center

Rio Grande do Sul
 Barra Shopping Sul
 Canoas Shopping
 Cristal Shopping
 Moinhos Shopping
 Shopping Praia de Belas

Rio de Janeiro
 Bangu Shopping
 Barra Garden
 Barra Point
 Barra Shopping
 Barra Square Shopping
 Barra World Shopping & Park
 Botafogo Praia Shopping
 Carioca Shopping
 Casa & Gourmet Shopping
 Città America Barra da Tijuca
 Downtown Barra da Tijuca
 Fórum de Ipanema
 Guadalupe Shopping
 Ilha Plaza Shopping
 Madureira Shopping
 New York City Center
 Norte Shopping
 Nova América Outlet Shopping
 Penha Shopping
 Park Jacarepaguá Shopping
 Park Shopping Campo Grande
 Parque Shopping Sulacap
 Quality Shopping
 Recreio Shopping
 Rio Design Center Barra
 Rio Design Center Leblon
 Rio Shopping
 Santa Cruz Shopping
 São Conrado Fashion Mall
 Shopping Boulevard
 Shopping da Gávea
 Shopping Grande Rio
 Shopping Jardim Guadalupe
 Shopping Leblon
 Shopping Nova Iguaçu
 Shopping Novo Leblon
 Shopping Plaza Niterói
 Shopping Rio Sul
 Shopping Tijuca
 Via Brasil Shopping
 Via Parque Shopping
 Village Mall
 West Shopping

São Paulo
 Campinas
 Galleria Shopping
 Shopping Iguatemi Campinas
 Shopping Parque Dom Pedro
 Guarulhos
 Shopping Internacional
 Riberão Preto
 Novo Shopping
 Ribeirão Shopping
 Shopping Santa Úrsula
 São Carlos
 Shopping Iguatemi São Carlos
 São Paulo
 Shopping Analia Franco - the most luxurious shopping mall in the east
 Shopping Aricanduva - the largest mall on Latin America; has around 480 000 square meters (5 200 000 square feet)
 Shopping Bourbon - one of the newest malls in the city; has one of the two IMAX cinemas in the country
 Shopping Center 3 - a gallery-like mall on Paulista Avenue
 Shopping Center Norte - a one-floor shopping in the city north
 Shopping Central Plaza
 Shopping Cidade Jardim - the most luxurious mall in the city, located by the Pinheiros River on Brooklyn region
 Shopping D&D - focused on decoration and design's located on Brooklyn, next to Shopping Nações Unidas
 Shopping Eldorado - one of the most classic malls on the city; located in the West
 Shopping Ibirapuera - among the most traditional shopping centres in the city, it is located near Ibirapuera Park
 Shopping Iguatemi São Paulo - the first mall in the city and also the first one in Brazil, located on Faria Lima Avenue 
 Shopping Iguatemi JK
 Shopping Light - in the Centro district, near Gallery of Rock and the Municipal Theater; the building was the past home of the extinct São Paulo Tramway, Light and Power Company
 Shopping Market Place - Shopping Morumbi's neighbour, it is inspired by an old European train station
 Shopping Metro Santa Cruz
 Shopping Metro Tatuape - the first shopping mall in São Paulo with a subway connection
 Shopping Metrô Tucuruvi
 Shopping Mooca
 Shopping Morumbi - one of the most popular malls in the city; has Brazils' best designers plus some international stores like Armani Exchange
 Shopping Nações Unidas - a very small shopping centre located on Brooklyn region
 Shopping Pátio Higienópolis - a luxurious mall in the Higienópolis neighborhood
 Shopping Paulista - an older mall near the end of Paulista Avenue
 Shopping Plaza Sul
 Shopping Vila Lobos - a popular mall on West; its architecture is inspired by the international style
 Shopping Vila Olímpia - a younger luxurious mall on the commercial Vila Olímpia neighborhood
 Shopping West Plaza

References 

Brazil
Shopping malls